The Guam national under-17 football team is the national association football youth team for the United States territory of Guam and is controlled by the Guam Football Association. They are affiliated with the Asian Football Confederation's East Asian Football Federation region.

Current squad

The following 23 players were called up for the 2023 AFC U-17 Asian Cup qualification.

Results and fixtures

Competition record

FIFA U-17 World Cup record

AFC U-16 Championship record

References

u17
Guam
Football in Guam